Paragevettikadu is a village in the Orathanadu taluk of Thanjavur district, Tamil Nadu, India.

Demographics 

As per the 2001 census, Paragevettikadu had a total population of 1947 with 956 males and 991 females. The sex ratio was 1037. The literacy rate was 73.46.

References 

 

Villages in Thanjavur district